Alfred Heinrich (born 10 February 1880, date of death unknown) was an Austrian rower. He competed in the men's single sculls event at the 1912 Summer Olympics.

References

External links
 
 

1880 births
Year of death missing
Austrian male rowers
Olympic rowers of Austria
Rowers at the 1912 Summer Olympics
Sportspeople from Vienna